Bascom Lamar Lunsford (March 21, 1882 – September 4, 1973) was a folklorist, performer of traditional Appalachian music, and lawyer from western North Carolina. He was often known by the nickname "Minstrel of the Appalachians."

Biography

Bascom Lamar Lunsford was born at Mars Hill, Madison County, North Carolina in 1882, into the world of traditional Appalachian folk music. At an early age, his father, a teacher, gave him a fiddle, and his mother sang religious songs and traditional ballads. Lunsford also learned banjo and began to perform at weddings and square dances.

After qualifying as a teacher at Rutherford College, Lunsford taught at schools in Madison County.  In 1913, Lunsford qualified in law at Trinity College, later to become Duke University. He began to travel and collect material at the start of the 20th century, often meeting singers on isolated farms. Lunsford has been quoted as saying he spent "nights in more homes from Harpers Ferry to Iron Mountain than anybody but God".

Appalachian music
Lunsford gave lectures and performances while dressed in a starched white shirt and black bow tie. This formal dress was part of his campaign against the stereotyping of “hillbillies”.

In 1922 Frank C. Brown, a song collector, recorded 32 items on wax cylinders from Bascom. In 1928, Lunsford recorded "Jesse James" and "I Wish I Was a Mole In the Ground" for the Brunswick record label. Harry Smith included "Mole" on his Anthology of American Folk Music in 1952. Smith's anthology also includes Lunsford's performance of the gospel song "Dry Bones", recorded in 1928.

Lunsford played in a style from Western North Carolina, which had a rhythmic up-stroke brushing the strings. It sounds similar to clawhammer banjo playing, which emphasises the downstroke. He also played a "mandoline", an instrument with mandolin body and a five-string banjo neck. He occasionally played fiddle for dance tunes such as "Rye Straw". He censored himself, avoiding obscene songs or omitting verses. His repertoire included Child Ballads, negro spirituals and parlor songs. A CD collection of Lunsford's recordings, from the Brunswick recordings of the 1920s to the recordings for the  Archive of American Folk Song at the Library of Congress in 1949, Ballads, Banjo Tunes and Sacred Songs of Western North Carolina, was released by Smithsonian Folkways Records in 1996.

The Mountain Dance and Folk Festival 

In 1927 the Asheville Chamber of Commerce organized a 'Rhododendron Festival' to encourage tourism. The Chamber asked Lunsford to invite local musicians and dancers. 1928 was the first year of the Mountain Dance and Folk Festival, often claimed as the first event to be described as a "Folk Festival". After a few years the rhododendron element disappeared but the festival continues to this day. He was the organiser and performed there every year until he suffered a stroke in 1965.

Lunsford cofounded the Bascom Lamar Lunsford "Minstrel of Appalachia" Festival, taking place at Lunsford's birthplace at Mars Hill University in Mars Hill, North Carolina, just 20 minutes north of Asheville.

Politics and fame 
Bascom was involved in the politics of the Democratic Party. He managed the campaign for Congressman Zebulon Weaver for North Carolina. From 1931 to 1934 he was a reading clerk of the North Carolina House of Representatives. Charles Seeger employed him in the mid-30s to promote singers in "Skyline Farms", as part of the "New Deal". Lunsford was invited to the White House by President Roosevelt in 1939, when he performed his music for King George VI.

Personal
Lunsford married Nellie Sarah Triplett (1881-1960). They had six daughters (Sarah, Ellen, Lynn, Nellie, Merton & Josefa) and one son (Blackwell). After Nellie's death Lunsford married Freda English nee Metcalf (1913-1974). Bascom Lunsford died on 4 September 1973. Fifteen months after Bascom's death, Freda took her own life.

Influence
In 1964, the North Carolina fantasy and horror writer Manly Wade Wellman dedicated his book "Who Fears the Devil?" to Lunsford. Wellman's fictional protagonist, Silver John, was an Appalachian folk singer, like Lunsford.

Bob Dylan, who listened to the Anthology of American Folk Music, echoed a line from "I Wish I Was a Mole In the Ground." Lunsford sang, "'Cause a railroad man they'll kill you when he can / And drink up your blood like wine," which is echoed by Dylan's line "Mona tried to tell me / To stay away from the train line / She said that all the railroad men / Just drink up your blood like wine" on his song "Stuck Inside of Mobile With the Memphis Blues Again", recorded in 1966 for the album Blonde on Blonde.

Greil Marcus discussed the meaning of "I Wish I Was a Mole In the Ground" both in his liner notes to Bob Dylan and The Band's album, The Basement Tapes (1975), and in his book Lipstick Traces.

Lunsford's original recording of "Good Old Mountain Dew" was used as the first advertising theme for the newly created Mountain Dew soda. He sold the rights to the song for a train ticket home. 

In 1964 Lunsford was the subject of a documentary film, shot with a 16mm hand held camera, by New York City filmmaker, David Hoffman.

Discography 

 Song and Ballads of American History and of the Assassination of American Presidents (1952)
 Smokey Mountain Ballads (1953) (Folkways)
 Minstrel of the Appalachians (1956) (Riverside: RLP 12-645)	
 Bascom Lamar Lunsford (1956) (Riverside)
 Music from South Turkey Creek (1976) (Rounder Records)
 Ballads, Banjo Tunes and Sacred Songs of Western North Carolina (1996) (Smithsonian Folkways)

Notes

References

 Jones, Loyal.  Minstrel of the Appalachians: The Story of Bascom Lamar Lunsford (Appalachian Consortium Press, 1984; Lexington: University Press of Kentucky, 2002).  
 Jones, Loyal. 2017. My Curious and Jocular Heroes: Tales and Tale-Spinners from Appalachia.  Urbana: University of Illinois Press.

External links
 Listen to "Dry Bones" at the Internet Archive's Open Source Audio collection (30 - second sample)
 Listen to "I Wish I Was A Mole In The Ground" at the Internet Archive's Open Source Audio collection
 Listen to "Mountain Dew" at the Internet Archive's Open Source Audio collection
 Listen to "Lost John Dean" at the Internet Archive's Open Source Audio collection (30 - second sample)
 
  by David Hoffman

1882 births
1973 deaths
People from Mars Hill, North Carolina
American fiddlers
American banjoists
American folk-song collectors
American folklorists
Old-time musicians
20th-century American lawyers
Duke University Trinity College of Arts and Sciences alumni
North Carolina Democrats
Appalachian old-time fiddlers
20th-century violinists